Plesiotriton is a genus of sea snails, marine gastropod mollusks in the subfamily Plesiotritoninae  of the family Cancellariidae, the nutmeg snails.

Species
Species within the genus Plesiotriton include:
 † Plesiotriton angustus (Watelet, 1851)
 † Plesiotriton aucoini Lesport, Cluzaud & Verhecken, 2015 
 † Plesiotriton cailloelensis Pacaud, Ledon & Loubry, 2015
 † Plesiotriton calciatus Pacaud, Ledon & Loubry, 2015
 † Plesiotriton camiadeorum Lesport, Cluzaud & Verhecken, 2015
 † Plesiotriton cedri (J. Gardner, 1935) 
 † Plesiotriton clandestinus Pacaud, Ledon & Loubry, 2015
 † Plesiotriton cretaceus Sohl, 1960 
 † Plesiotriton evanesco Pacaud, Ledon & Loubry, 2015
 † Plesiotriton ganensis Lesport, Cluzaud & Verhecken, 2015
 † Plesiotriton hillegondae (Martin, 1914) 
 † Plesiotriton imbricatus (Dareste de la Chavanne, 1910) 
 † Plesiotriton jacquesponsi Pacaud, Ledon & Loubry, 2015
 † Plesiotriton latus (Dareste de la Chavanne, 1910) 
 Plesiotriton mirabilis Beu & Maxwell, 1987
 Plesiotriton silinoensis Verhecken, 2011
 † Plesiotriton steni Schnetler & Petit, 2006 
 † Plesiotriton teuleraensis Lesport, Cluzaud & Verhecken, 2015
 Plesiotriton vivus Habe & Okutani, 1981
 † Plesiotriton vokesae (Allen, 1970) 
 † Plesiotriton volutellus (Lamarck, 1803)
Species brought into synonymy
 † Plesiotriton deshayesianus Beu & Maxwell, 1987: synonym of † Colubratriton deshayesianus (Beu & Maxwell, 1987)  (original combination)
 † Plesiotriton (Turehua) Marwick, 1943: synonym of † Turehua Marwick, 1943

References

 Beu A.G. & Maxwell P.A. (1987) A revision of the fossil and living gastropods related to Plesiotriton Fischer, 1884 (Family Cancellariidae, Subfamily Plesiotritoninae n. subfam.). With an appendix: Genera of Buccinidae Pisaniinae related to Colubraria Schumacher, 1817. New Zealand Geological Survey Paleontological Bulletin 54:1-140

External links
  Fischer P. (1880-1887). Manuel de Conchyliologie et de Paléontologie Conchyliologique. Paris, Savy pp. XXIV + 1369 + pl. 23

Cancellariidae